Tata Globus is a range of fully built buses manufactured by Tata Motors. The Tata Globus Range is available in 13, 18, 20 and 45 seater configurations. The body is built by ACGL, Goa.

Variants
 Globus 13 - Chassis Platform - LP 410/31
 Globus 18 - Chassis Platform - LP 709/38
 Globus 20 - Chassis Platform - LPO 918/42
 Globus 45 - Chassis Platform - LPO 1616/62
 Globus CNG Hybrid -

Hispano Globus

The Hispano Globus is built on the 1623c chassis having a rear mount 5.9litres 235 hp Cummins 6BT series diesel engine with turbocharger and intercooler. The engine produces 800Nm torque at 1500rpm. It is primarily intended for tourist and long-distance duties. The coach is built at ACGL, Goa and it is designed by Hispano Carrocera. The body shell is from Spain and it is a re-badged version of Hispano Divo luxury coach.

See also 

 List of buses

External links
 http://buses.tatamotors.com/luxury_introduction.htm
 https://web.archive.org/web/20100608153458/http://www.acglgoa.net/bus-bodies.htm

2000s cars
Rear-engined vehicles
Vehicles introduced in 2006
Globus